José Manuel Sagredo Chávez (born 10 March 1994) is a Bolivian footballer who plays as a left back for Club Bolívar.

Club career statistics

References

External links
 

1994 births
Living people
Bolivian footballers
Club Blooming players
2021 Copa América players
Association football defenders